Fornjót (Old Norse: Fornjótr) is a jötunn in Norse mythology, and the father of Hlér ('sea'), Logi ('fire') and Kári ('wind'). It is also the name of a legendary king of "Finnland and Kvenland". The principal study of this figure is by Margaret Clunies Ross.

Name 
The etymology of the Old Norse name Fornjótr remains unclear. It is often interpreted as forn-jótr ('ancient or primordial jötunn'), or as for-njótr ('original owner', or 'destroyer'). Alternative meanings such as Forn-njótr ('one-who-enjoys-sacrifices') or Forn-þjótr ('ancient screamer') have also been proposed.

According to Peter Erasmus Müller (1818), Fornjótr could be interpreted as the "original owner" (primus occupans vel utens) of Norway.

An Old English cognate of Fornjótr may appear in a plant-name attested in the Cleopatra Glossary (as forneotes folm) and in Bald's Leechbook as fornetes folm. Folm means 'hand, palm', and, lacking a better explanation, scholars have suggested that fornetes is an Old English form of the name Fornjótr, such that the plant's name meant 'Fornet's palm'. The plant denoted by this name has not been certainly identified, but Peter Bierbaumer argued for a species of marsh-orchid (Dactylorhiza), partly on account of the supposed similarity of their tubers to hands.

Attestations

Eddas 
Þjóðólfr of Hvinir, a Norwegian skald of the late 9th–early 10th century AD cited in Ynglinga tal (29), apparently uses the kenning "son of Fornjót" as a synonym of 'fire', and another skald only known under the name Svein appears to use the kenning "ugly sons of Fornjót" to mean the 'wind'.How should the wind be periphrased? Thus: call it son of Fornjót, Brother of the Sea and of Fire, Scathe or Ruin or Hound or Wolf of the Wood or of the Sail or of the Rigging.
Thus spake Svein in the Nordrsetu-drápa:
First began to flyFornjót's sons ill-shapen.
In the þulur, Fornjót is also included in a list of jötnar.

Sagas 
In the Orkneyinga saga and in Hversu Noregr byggdisk (How Norway Was Settled), Fornjót is portrayed as a king ruling over Gotland and Jutland, "which is called Finnland (the land of the Sámi) and Kvenland [the Finnish-settled part of northern Norway]". Some editors alter "Gotland" or "Jutland" to "that land". In those two sources, Fornjót has three sons: Logi ('fire'), Kári ('wind'), and Hlér ('sea'), "whom we call Ægir" according to Fundinn Noregr.

Ancestor of the House of Yngling
Fornjótr appears as an ancestor-figure of the kings of Norway in several sources. Here follows one rendering of a mythic Yngling family tree based on Historia Norwegiæ, Ynglinga saga, Beowulf and other Old Norse sources, some of which name Fornjótr. The names of Swedish kings are shown in bold.

References

Bibliography 

Jötnar
Orkneyinga saga characters